FBK may refer to:

Sport 
 Basketball Federation of Kosovo
 Fanny Blankers-Koen Games, a Dutch athletics competition
 Färjestads BK, a Swedish ice hockey club
 FBK Kaunas, a Lithuanian football club
 Frillesås BK, a Swedish bandy club

Other uses 
 Florida Blue Key, an honor society at the University of Florida
 Führerbegleitkommando, Adolf Hitler's SS security unit
 Ladd Army Airfield, at Fort Wainwright, Fairbanks, Alaska, United States
 Anti-Corruption Foundation (FBK), an NGO led by Russian opposition figure Alexei Navalny
 Shirakami Fubuki, a virtual YouTuber from the idol group Hololive

See also
 Phi Beta Kappa Society (ΦΒΚ)